Torkan or Turkan may refer to:
Torkan (surname)
Türkan, Azerbaijan
Torkan, Afghanistan
Turgan Valley, Afghanistan
Torkan, Fars, Iran
Torkan, Kerman, Iran
Torkan, Sirjan, Kerman Province, Iran
Torkan, Qazvin, Iran
Torkan, West Azerbaijan, Iran
Torkan, Yazd, Yazd
Torkan, a comic strip